Hosea is an inkhundla of Eswatini, located in the Shiselweni District, with 19,608 people as of 2007.

References
Statoids.com, retrieved December 11, 2010

Populated places in Shiselweni Region